I Have Two Mothers and Two Fathers is a 1968 Yugoslav/Croatian comedy drama film directed by Krešo Golik.

The film won the Golden Arena for Best Actress (Mia Oremović) and Golden Arena for Best Cinematography (Ivica Rajković) at the 1968 Pula Film Festival, the Yugoslav national film awards.

In 1999, a poll of Croatian film critics found it to be one of the best Croatian films ever made.

References

External links

1968 films
1968 drama films
Jadran Film films
Films directed by Krešo Golik
Yugoslav drama films
Films set in Yugoslavia
Films set in Croatia